Tillandsia oaxacana is a species of flowering plant in the genus Tillandsia. This species is endemic to Mexico.

References

oaxacana
Flora of Mexico